Rodrick Wayne Moore Jr. (born October 22, 1998), known professionally as Roddy Ricch, is an American rapper, singer, and songwriter. He rose to fame in 2018 with his single, "Die Young", which peaked at number 98 on the Billboard Hot 100. Ricch's first two mixtapes, Feed Tha Streets (2017) and Feed Tha Streets  II (2018), also received widespread acclaim. In 2019, Ricch was featured alongside Hit-Boy on Nipsey Hussle's single, "Racks in the Middle", which earned him a Grammy Award for Best Rap Performance, and on Mustard's Grammy-nominated single "Ballin'", which reached 11 on the Hot 100.

Ricch's debut album, Please Excuse Me for Being Antisocial, was released through Atlantic Records and Bird Vision Entertainment on December 6, 2019, and debuted atop the Billboard 200, becoming his first chart-topping album. It spawned the Hot 100 number-one single "The Box", which earned him a diamond certification by the RIAA, as well as the top ten single "High Fashion", which features Mustard. Later in 2020, Ricch's feature on DaBaby's single, "Rockstar", became his second number-one single on the Hot 100. His second studio album, Live Life Fast, was released on December 17, 2021.

Ricch has won several accolades, including a Grammy Award from nine different nominations, as well as two BET Awards, two BET Hip Hop Awards, and an American Music Award.

Early life 
Rodrick Wayne Moore Jr. was born on October 22, 1998, in Compton, California. Moore grew up in a Christian household. He attended Compton High School. Moore started rapping as young as eight, and at the age of twelve, performed for at-the-time rising artist and fellow Compton native, Kendrick Lamar. He began making beats in earnest at age 16. In Compton, Moore was a member of the Park Village Compton Crips, and has two "C"s tattooed, symbolizing his previous affiliation with the gang. He also had a brief stint in county jail at the time when his second commercial mixtape, Feed Tha Streets II, was released. Moore listened to Lil Wayne growing up, as well as Young Thug, Future, and Meek Mill.

Career

2017–2018: Commercial debut, Feed Tha Streets, and Feed Tha Streets II 
On November 22, 2017, Ricch released his debut commercial mixtape, Feed Tha Streets, which is also his first project. It featured songs like "Chase tha Bag", "HoodRicch", and "Fucc It Up". The tape earned him praise from established rappers, such as Meek Mill, Nipsey Hussle, and 03 Greedo, as well as established record producer Mustard.

In March 2018, Ricch released his unofficial debut extended play, Be 4 Tha Fame. In May of the same year, American rapper Nipsey Hussle brought Ricch out as his special guest at a PowerHouse concert in Los Angeles. On July 20, Ricch released the single, "Die Young", the lead single from his second commercial mixtape, Feed Tha Streets II. Ricch had written the song for a childhood friend, who was lost in a high-speed chase and said in a Genius interview he had written it the night that fellow American rapper XXXTentacion had died from being shot on June 18. The song—which was dedicated, in part, to the childhood friend and its music video would go on to accumulate over 80 million views on YouTube and 120 million streams on Spotify. On September 27, 2018, he released the single "Ricch Forever". In October, American rapper Meek Mill brought Ricch out as his special guest at a PowerHouse concert in Philadelphia, in which he also gifted Ricch a "Dreamchasers" chain for appearing on his fourth studio album, Championships, in which he was co-featured alongside fellow American rappers Future and Young Thug on the song "Splash Warning", which was released a few weeks later on November 30. On October 28, Ricch released the single, "Every Season", as the second single from Feed Tha Streets II. He released the mixtape on November 2. The album, which features the singles "Die Young" and "Every Season", peaked at number 67 on the Billboard 200 chart and at number 36 on the Top R&B/Hip-Hop Albums chart. On December 7, 2018, Ricch released a collaboration with American DJ and record producer Marshmello, titled "Project Dreams".

2019–2020: Please Excuse Me for Being Antisocial 
On February 15, 2019, Ricch was featured alongside American record producer Hit-Boy on American rapper Nipsey Hussle's single, "Racks in the Middle". and earning him a Grammy Award for Best Rap Performance. Exactly one month later, on March 15, he was featured alongside fellow American rapper Tyga on the remix of American rapper Post Malone's 2018 single, "Wow". On May 31, Ricch released the single, "Out Tha Mud". On June 28, he released a collaboration with American record producer Mustard on the single, "Ballin'", as part of the latter's third studio album, Perfect Ten. The song received a nomination for Best Rap/Sung Performance at the 2020 Grammy Awards.

On October 11, 2019, Ricch released the single, "Big Stepper", which serves the lead single of his debut album, Please Excuse Me for Being Antisocial. Two weeks later, on October 25, he released the album's second single, "Start wit Me", which features fellow American rapper Gunna. Exactly one month later, on November 25, he released the album's third single "Tip Toe", which features fellow American rapper A Boogie wit da Hoodie. The album was released on December 6, 2019. It also features guest appearances from Lil Durk, Meek Mill, Mustard, and Ty Dolla Sign. The album debuted atop the Billboard 200 and spent four non-consecutive weeks on the chart, which became the longest running number one debut rap album in the US since 2003. The album contained Ricch's highest-charting single, "The Box", which was later released as the fourth single from the album on January 10, 2020, and topped the Billboard Hot 100 the following week, remaining there for eleven weeks. "High Fashion", which features Mustard, was released as the fifth single from the album on May 19, 2020.

On January 27, 2020, Ricch was featured on Meek Mill's single, "Letter to Nipsey", an ode to the now-late Nipsey Hussle. He was also co-featured alongside Gunna and American record producer London on da Track on A Boogie wit da Hoodie's single, "Numbers", from the latter's third studio album, Artist 2.0, which was released on February 14, 2020. He then appeared on American rapper NLE Choppa's single, "Walk Em Down", which was released on March 19, 2020, and appeared on the latter's debut studio album, Top Shotta. On April 17, 2020, Ricch was featured on American rapper DaBaby's single, "Rockstar", from the latter's third studio album, Blame It on Baby, which became his second number-one single on the Billboard Hot 100, spending seven weeks on top, as well as reaching number one in the UK, and in several other countries. Ricch became the first artist to achieve his first two number-one singles in the same year since English singer-songwriter Ed Sheeran did it in 2017. Ricch won Album of the Year at the 2020 BET Awards. He has spent eighteen cumulative weeks atop the Hot 100 so far, the most for any artist in 2020. On July 3, Ricch was featured alongside fellow American rapper 50 Cent on late fellow American rapper Pop Smoke's posthumous single "The Woo", from Smoke's debut studio album, Shoot for the Stars, Aim for the Moon. On August 27, Ricch appeared on fellow American rapper Cordae's single, "Gifted", a bonus track from the latter's second studio album, From a Birds Eye View (2022). On September 30, Ricch collaborated with American record label Internet Money and American singer and rapper Don Toliver on the remix of the latter two's top-10 single, "Lemonade", which the original song is also a collaboration with Gunna and features Canadian rapper Nav; the remix appeared on the complete edition of the label's debut album, B4 the Storm.

During an interview with GQ, Ricch revealed that his second studio album is completed, however, he said that he is waiting for the right time to release it. Ricch called the album "a full-blown masterpiece. A real idea. A real body of work". On November 24, 2020, he teased towards a potential upcoming project titled Love Is Barely Real Anymore. Ricch tied with Canadian singer the Weeknd as the most nominated artists at the 2020 American Music Awards, both with eight nominations.  He received six nominations at the 63rd Annual Grammy Awards, including for Song of the Year and Record of the Year for "The Box" and "Rockstar", respectively. Variety named him Breakthrough Artist of 2020, and Apple Music awarded him Album and Song of the Year in 2020, with Please Excuse Me for Being Antisocial and "The Box" respectively being the most-streamed album and song of the year globally on the platform. He was ranked third on the Billboard Year-End chart for Top Artists.

2021-present: Live Life Fast, and Feed Tha Streets III 
On March 14, 2021, Ricch officially released a live performance of an unreleased song called "Heartless", which he debuted at the 63rd Annual Grammy Awards. On April 2, Ricch released a collaboration with fellow American rapper 42 Dugg, titled "4 Da Gang", which appeared as the lead single from the latter's commercial mixtape, Free Dem Boyz. Ricch was also co-featured alongside American singer and rapper Bryson Tiller and American rapper Lil Baby on DJ Khaled's single, "Body in Motion", from the latter's self-titled twelfth studio album, Khaled Khaled, which was released on April 30. On May 21, Ricch released a collaboration with fellow American rapper Birdman, titled "Stunnaman", which features American rapper Lil Wayne, on May 21. On June 4, Ricch released the single, "Late at Night", the lead single from his second studio album, Live Life Fast. Ricch also released a collaboration with fellow American rapper Bino Rideaux, titled "Lemme Find Out", on October 1. On December 3, Ricch also joined Gunna and Future on a remix of their single, "Too Easy", which appeared on Gunna's debut studio album, DS4Ever.

On September 14, Ricch posted a story to Instagram, in which he revealed the album title. He used the album title again on social media posts a couple days later. On November 30, in preparation for the release of the album, Ricch deleted all his previous posts from Instagram and announced the release date and revealed its cover art the following day. The album was released on December 17. features guest appearances from Future, Kodak Black, 21 Savage, Takeoff, Jamie Foxx, Ty Dolla Sign, Alex Isley, Fivio Foreign, Lil Baby, and Gunna. On May 12, 2022, Ricch was featured on Post Malone's single, "Cooped Up", which appeared on the latter's fourth studio album, Twelve Carat Toothache.

On October 22, Ricch announced the release date and revealed its cover art for Feed Tha Streets III.

Personal life 
In August 2019, Ricch was arrested for felony domestic violence after he allegedly physically assaulted his girlfriend, American model and businesswoman Allie Minati, at his Los Angeles home. Ricch was booked at 5:40 a.m. PT and later released on a $50,000 bond. All charges were later dropped by the Los Angeles County District Attorney's office due to insufficient evidence. In April 2020, Minati gave birth to their son.

On February 21, 2021, a shooting occurred at Ricch and fellow American rapper 42 Dugg's music video shoot for their collaborative single, "4 Da Gang", which left three people injured in Atlanta, Georgia. American rapper OMB Peezy was later charged in connection with the shooting with aggravated assault with a deadly weapon and possession of a firearm during the commission of a crime. Ricch and Dugg were unharmed. All three injured survived.

On June 11, 2022, Ricch was arrested on weapons charges after him and members of his crew were stopped at a security checkpoint near Citi Field, where law enforcement found a loaded firearm, additional ammunition, and a large-capacity magazine. Ricch has been charged with criminal possession of a weapon, possession of a large capacity ammunition feeding device, and unlawful possession of an ammunition feeding device.

Artistry 

On the transcending themes of his music, Ricch draws inspiration from his life, stating: "As I experience life, my music is gonna evolve. At the same time, I still do tell the stories from my world because there are unlimited stories and unlimited people from that place. I'll always represent them. As my life begins to change and I do different things, I still want to be able to tap in and relate to them". Cady Lang of Time magazine noted Ricch's "remarkable musical style as a rapper combines his West Coast [hip hop] roots with the sound of trap music and Chicago drill rap, which gets an extra gravitas with his lyrics that range from pondering the tough realities of life to bouts of uninhibited bravado". Ricch has been recognized for his raspy voice "that works wonders with vocal filters". Paul Thompson of Vulture called Ricch "an undeniably talented vocalist and occasionally a compelling songwriter", opining how he "frequently adopts the same syntax and vocal intonations as Young Thug". His music style blends rapping and singing. Ricch has cited Kendrick Lamar, who is also from his hometown of Compton, as a musical influence. He has stated that rapper Speaker Knockerz is his biggest influence, along with the "basis" of his music coming from him. Ricch also credits Young Thug, Future, and Gucci Mane as influences.

Discography 

Please Excuse Me for Being Antisocial (2019)
Live Life Fast (2021)
Love is Barely Real Anymore (2023)

Awards and nominations

See also 

 List of artists who reached number one in the United States

References

External links 

1998 births
Living people
American male rappers
Atlantic Records artists
Crips
Grammy Award winners for rap music
Musicians from Compton, California
Record producers from California
21st-century American rappers

Trap musicians
Gangsta rappers